Saint-André-sur-Vieux-Jonc is a commune in the Ain department in eastern France.

Geography
The Veyle forms most of the commune's northeastern boundary.

Population

See also
 Dombes
Communes of the Ain department

References

Communes of Ain
Ain communes articles needing translation from French Wikipedia